Naeem Mohaiemen (born 1969) uses film, photography, installation, and essays to research South Asia's postcolonial markers (the Indo-Pakistani War of 1947–1948 and the Bangladesh Liberation War of 1971). His projects on the 1970s revolutionary left explores the role of misrecognition within global solidarity. He is a member of the Institute of Contemporary Arts Independent Film Council.

Education
Mohaiemen received a PhD in anthropology in 2019 from Columbia University and is an Associate Professor of Visual Arts there. He received BA in economics and concentration in history from Oberlin College in 1993. He was a member of Oberlin College's Board of Trustees (1994–1996).

Films

 Tripoli Cancelled (2017), premiered at Documenta 14 in Athens. British premiere at the British Film Institute London Film Festival. American premiere at Museum of Modern Art, New York.
Two Meetings and a Funeral (2017), premiered at Documenta 14 in Kassel (which derives from The Young Man Was project). British premiere at Tate Britain as part of 2018 Turner Prize shortlist. American premiere at Art Institute of Chicago.

The Young Man Was

Part 4: Abu Ammar is Coming (2016) – examines a photograph of five men who were supposedly Bangladeshi and affiliated with the Palestinian Liberation Organisation in the early 1980s, questioning how contemporary relations between the involved nations might be reshaped.
Part 3: Last Man in Dhaka Central (2015) – premiered at the 56th Venice Biennale as part of "All The World's Futures" curated by Okwui Enwezor.
Part 2: Afsan's Long Day (2014) – premiered at the Museum of Modern Art in New York as part of "Doc Fortnight". It had a festival premiere at Oberhausen and a British premiere at the British Film Institute London Film Festival.
Part 1: United Red Army (2011) – about Japan Airlines Flight 472 (1977) Hijacking in Dhaka, premiered at Sharjah Biennial, Hot Docs, and International Documentary Film Festival Amsterdam (IDFA), has shown at The New Museum and is in the permanent collection of the Tate Modern.

Prisoners of Shothik Itihash

Der Weisse Engel (2008)
Rankin Street 1953 (2009)

Visible Collective: Disappeared in America (2002–2006)
Patriot Story (2004, with Jawad Metni)
Fear of Flying (2005, with Anjali Malhotra)
Lingering: Twenty (2005, with Sehban Zaidi)
Invisible Man (2006)
White Teeth (2011)

Exhibitions
Chapters from Mohaiemen's project on the 1970s revolutionary left ("The Young Man Was") have exhibited at the Mahmoud Darwish Museum, Gyantapas Abdur Razzaq Foundation, Bangladesh Shilpakala Academy, Bengal Foundation Shilpalay, Chobi Mela, Documenta 14, Kiran Nadar Museum, Museum of Modern Art New York, British Museum, Tate Britain, New Museum (New York), Frieze Art Fair (London), MUAC Mexico City, the 56th Venice Biennial, and the Lahore, Sharjah, Marrakech, and Eva (Ireland) Biennials.

Mohaiemen co-founded Visible Collective, a collective of New York-based artists and lawyers investigating post-9/11 security panic. Visible's work exhibited internationally, including the 2006 Whitney Biennial of American Art ("Wrong Gallery" room) and L'institut des cultures d'Islam in Paris.

His solo projects have looked at military coups ("My Mobile Weighs A Ton" at Dhaka Gallery Chitrak), surveillance ("Otondro Prohori, Guarding Who?", Chobi Mela V at Bangladesh Shilpakala Academy), Indian partition ("Kazi in Nomansland" at Dubai Third Line), architectural nationalism ("Penn Station Kills Me" at Exit Art), and dueling leftist and Islamist politics ("Live True Life or Die Trying" at Cue Art Foundation, New York).

Writing
Mohaiemen is author of Prisoners of Shothik Itihash. He edited the anthologies Between Ashes and Hope: Chittagong Hill Tracts in the blind spot of Bangladesh nationalism, Collectives in atomised time,

He was the primary critic of Dead Reckoning, a book by Sarmila Bose on the 1971 war of Bangladesh. His response was cited by the BBC and published in Economic & Political Weekly ("Waiting for a real reckoning on 1971"). Bose responded to his remarks in the same periodical, followed by a rebuttal from Mohaiemen.

Essays on Bangladesh history include"Muktijuddho: Polyphony of the Ocean", "Accelerated Media and the 1971 Genocide", "Musee Guimet as Proxy Fight", "Mujtaba Ali: Amphibian Man" (The Rest of Now, Rana Dasgupta ed.),  "Mujib Coat" (Bidoun journal), and "Everybody wants to be Singapore" (Carlos Motta’s The Good Life). He wrote the chapter on religious and ethnic minorities in the Ain o Salish Kendro Annual Report for Bangladesh.

Essays on diaspora include "Known unknowns of the class war" (Margins, Asian American Writers Workshop),"The skin I'm in: Afro-Bengali solidarity and possible futures" (Margins, Asian American Writers Workshop), "Beirut, Silver Porsche Illusion" (Men of the Global South, Zed Books), "Why Mahmud Can’t Be a Pilot" (Nobody Passes: Rejecting the rules of Gender and Conformity, Seal Press), and "No Exit" (Asian Superhero Comics, New Press).

Essays on culture include "Islamic Roots of HipHop" (Sound Unbound, MIT Press; Runner Up for Villem Flusser Theory Award), "Adman blues become artist liberation" (Indian Highway, curated by Hans Ulrich Obrist) and "At the coed dance " (Art Lies: Death of the Curator).

Awards
2014: Guggenheim Fellowship from the John Simon Guggenheim Memorial Foundation
2018: Turner Prize nominee
Shortlisted for the 2009 Villem Flusser Award and the 2019 Herb Alpert Award.

References

External links
 
 Academia
 Conversation about Naeem Mohaiemen's methodology and artistic practice, 2019

1969 births
Living people
Bangladeshi male writers
Bangladeshi artists
Bangladeshi film directors
Bangladeshi academics
Oberlin College alumni
Columbia Graduate School of Arts and Sciences alumni
Columbia University faculty